FK Metalac Gornji Milanovac is a professional football club based in Gornji Milanovac, Serbia. They compete in the Serbian First League, the second tier of the national league system.

History
The club was founded as FK Radnik on 12 June 1961. The initiative came from Miroslav Spasojević, a former FK Takovo player, and was backed by two local companies, Graditelj and Metalac. The club was immediately registered with the Čačak Football Subassociation and started competing in the local leagues. They would change their name to FK Metalac in 1965. The club made its first notable achievement by qualifying for the Yugoslav Cup in 1974, but lost away to Borac Travnik in the opening round.

In 1995, the club merged with FK Autoeksport, taking its spot in the Morava-Šumadija Zone League, the fourth tier of football in FR Yugoslavia. They would go on to earn promotion to the Serbian League Morava in 1997. However, the club suffered relegation from the third tier after just one season. After securing two consecutive promotions, they historically reached the Second League of FR Yugoslavia in 2000, but finished bottom of the table in their debut season in the second tier. The club subsequently won the Serbian League Morava in 2002 and would go on to play in the Second League until 2004.

After spending three seasons in the third tier, the club became the Serbian League West champions in 2007 and were promoted to the Serbian First League. They played for two seasons in the second tier, placing fifth in the 2008–09 Serbian First League and earning promotion to the Serbian SuperLiga for the first time in their history. The club ended ninth in its debut appearance in the top flight. They spent two more seasons in the top tier, before finishing bottom of the table in 2012.

After narrowly missing promotion in 2014, the club managed to return to the top flight in 2015, defeating Napredak Kruševac in a two-legged playoff. They were relegated back to the First League after finishing second from the bottom in the 2016–17 Serbian SuperLiga. During the COVID-19-shortened 2019–20 season, the club placed fourth in the standings and was promoted to the SuperLiga for the third time.

Honours
Serbian League Morava / Serbian League West (Tier 3)
 2001–02 / 2006–07

Seasons

Stadium

After playing home matches at various stadiums in Gornji Milanovac and other neighboring cities for years, the club moved into the newly built Stadion Metalac in 2012. The stadium has a capacity of 4,400 seats.

Players

First-team squad

Notable players
This is a list of players who have played at full international level.

  Misdongarde Betolngar
  Prestige Mboungou
  Yaw Antwi
  Kwame Boateng
  Richard Odada
  Miloš Krkotić
  Staniša Mandić
  Janko Simović
  Nikola Karčev
  Nikola Ćirković
  Filip Kljajić
  Marko Mirić
  Stefan Mitrović
  Miljan Mutavdžić
  Aleksandar Sedlar
  Jovan Vlalukin

For a list of all FK Metalac Gornji Milanovac players with a Wikipedia article, see :Category:FK Metalac Gornji Milanovac players.

Managerial history

References

External links
 
 Club page at Srbijasport

1961 establishments in Serbia
Association football clubs established in 1961
Football clubs in Serbia
Gornji Milanovac